2 Corinthians 2 is the second chapter of the Second Epistle to the Corinthians in the New Testament of the Christian Bible. It is authored by Paul the Apostle and Timothy (2 Corinthians 1:1) in Macedonia in 55–56 CE.

Text
The original text was written in Koine Greek. This chapter is divided into 17 verses.

Textual witnesses
Some early manuscripts containing the text of this chapter are:
Papyrus 46 (~AD 200)
Codex Vaticanus (325–350)
Codex Sinaiticus (330–360)
Codex Alexandrinus (400–440; complete)
Codex Ephraemi Rescriptus (~450)
Codex Freerianus (~450; extant verses 3–4, 14)
Codex Claromontanus (~550)

Forgive the Offender
The unnamed offender, "such a one" (KJV), "a man in his position" (J. B. Phillips' translation) is the man who, in  "has his father’s wife".

Verse 16
 To the one we are the aroma of death leading to death, and to the other the aroma of life leading to life. And who is sufficient for these things?
"Leading to death" (NKJV; KJV: "unto death"): or "for death", "appointed to" death (cf. ).

Verse 17
 For we are not, as so many, peddling the word of God; but as of sincerity, but as from God, we speak in the sight of God in Christ.
"We are not, as so many": Paul separates himself from the false apostles, who are "many", forming "great swarms of false teachers" in the early times of Christianity (cf.). Some copies read, "as the rest", as the Syriac and Arabic versions.
"Peddling the word of God" (KJV: which corrupt the word of God): that is the Scriptures in general may be corrupted by "false glosses and human mixtures." The Syriac version reads the words Nygzmmd, "who mix the word of God."
"We speak ... in Christ": which is "in the name of Christ, of or concerning him, and him only."

See also
Jesus Christ
Macedonia
Titus
Troas
Related Bible parts: 2 Corinthians 1, 1 John 2, 1 John 4

References

Bibliography

External links
 King James Bible - Wikisource
English Translation with Parallel Latin Vulgate 
Online Bible at GospelHall.org (ESV, KJV, Darby, American Standard Version, Bible in Basic English)
Multiple bible versions at Bible Gateway (NKJV, NIV, NRSV etc.)

2 Corinthians 2